Toxopatagus is an extinct  genus of sea urchins.

References

Holasteroida